Bachmannia is a monotypic genus of flowering plant in the family Capparaceae with the sole member being Bachmannia woodii, (Xhosa: Umtswantswantsa) the four-finger bush. It is native to southeastern Africa.

Etymology 
The taxon name "Bachmannia" is named after Dr Frans Ewald Bachmann, a German naturalist and medical practitioner.

Description 
This plant is a small, shrub-like tree that can grow to reach between 1.5 - 3m tall. It has a light brown bark.

The flowers are pink and bell-shaped.

Distribution 
This plant can be found in southern Mozambique, EmaMpondweni and the KwaZulu-Natal region. This species is located in coastal forests, usually occurring on sandstone. It prefers to live in lower altitudes.

References

Capparaceae
Flora of Africa
Monotypic Brassicales genera